Stanisław Ostrowski (29 October 1892 – 22 November 1982) was a Polish politician, best known for serving as the last Polish Mayor of Lwow, and was President of Poland-in-exile.

Life and career
Ostrowski was born in Lemberg, Kingdom of Galicia and Lodomeria. His father, Michał Ostrowski, had earlier fought in the pro-Polish January Uprising of 1863 for which he was sent to the Russian katorga in Siberia.

Stanisław Ostrowski studied medicine at Lwow University. During the Polish-Ukrainian War (battle of Lwów (1918)) and the Polish-Bolshevik War (1919–1920) Ostrowski participated as a physician with the Polish Army. Following these conflicts he became Vice Mayor, and later Mayor, of Lwow. He was also a three-term member of the Sejm from the BBWR Bloc. As a legislator he focused on health affairs as well as developing a reputation of being a defender of minorities' rights.

After the Soviet invasion of Poland (1939), he was arrested and imprisoned in Moscow (until 1941). Among his fellow prisoners was Anandyn Amar, former Prime Minister and President of Mongolia. He was released from Soviet captivity on amnesty following the Sikorski–Mayski agreement as an officer of the Polish Army in the East by efforts of (commander-in-chief general Władysław Anders) in 1942.

In 1944–1945 he participated in the anti-Nazi Germany Italian campaign as a physician of military hospitals. When World War II ended, he moved to England and became involved in the politics of the Polish community there, which included the Polish government in exile.

Ostrowski was the third president of Poland in exile (1972–1979). He took office after death of President August Zaleski. To begin with he had to deal with a deep crisis within the emigre circles. Zaleski, despite earlier promises, declined to step down after seven years in office (1954), which caused formation of the Council of Three, an opposition body, recognized by a part of the emigres as a collective head of state. Ostrowski's selection was recognized by the council, which then dissolved itself. Because of that Ostrowski is credited for uniting Polish emigree circles. He also strongly refused to acknowledge annexation of the eastern areas of the Second Polish Republic by the USSR after World War II.

As promised, President Ostrowski stepped down after a seven-years term in favor of Edward Bernard Raczyński.

Ostrowski died in London and was buried in a Polish military cemetery in Newark-on-Trent, along with August Zaleski and Władysław Raczkiewicz, other past Presidents in exile. In November 2022, the trio's remains were moved from the cemetery at Newark-on-Trent in England to the mausoleum for emigree presidents at the Temple of Divine Providence in Warsaw.

In 1987 a plaque dedicated to Ostrowski was unveiled in the St. Stanislaus Kostka Church, Warsaw.

Ostrowski died without children.

See also
 List of mayors of Lviv

References

 Biography from an official Presidential website
 The last President of Lviv
 Ostrowski memories

1892 births
1982 deaths
People from the Kingdom of Galicia and Lodomeria
Polish Austro-Hungarians
Nonpartisan Bloc for Cooperation with the Government politicians
Camp of National Unity politicians
Members of the Sejm of the Second Polish Republic (1930–1935)
Members of the Sejm of the Second Polish Republic (1935–1938)
Members of the Sejm of the Second Polish Republic (1938–1939)
Mayors of Lviv
Polish anti-communists
20th-century Polish physicians
Polish people of the Polish–Ukrainian War
Polish people of the Polish–Soviet War
Polish deportees to Soviet Union
Foreign Gulag detainees
Polish military doctors